César Zamora, (born May 27, 1991) is an American soccer player.

Zamora was born in Granada Hills, California. On May 28, 2009, Zamora signed a professional contract with Chivas USA after spending 3 years in their youth system.  He made his professional debut in a SuperLiga match against Mexican club San Luis.  Zamora was waived by Chivas USA in March 2011.

Zamora represented the United States in their youth system, making 3 appearances with the U.S. U-20 national team.

Statistics

References

External links
 

1991 births
Living people
American soccer players
Chivas USA players
Soccer players from California
United States men's under-20 international soccer players
People from Granada Hills, Los Angeles
Association football midfielders
Homegrown Players (MLS)